Lasesarre is a stadium in Barakaldo, Spain.  It is currently used for football matches and is the home stadium of Barakaldo CF.  The stadium holds 7,960 spectators.

References

External links
Stadium information
Estadio de Espana 

Lasesarre
Barakaldo CF
Buildings and structures in Biscay
Estuary of Bilbao
Sports venues completed in 2003